Leitholm is a village in the Scottish Borders area of Scotland,  north-west of Coldstream, in the former county of Berwickshire.

Other places nearby include the Crosshall cross, Duns, Eccles, Ednam, Fogo, Greenlaw, Hume Castle, Polwarth, Westruther.

Other placenames: Leitholm Peel

See also
List of places in the Scottish Borders
List of places in Scotland

References

External links

RCAHMS: Leitholm, Lambden Burn, West Leitholm Bridge
RCAHMS: Leitholm, 2 Main Street, Schoolhouse
SCRAN: Various resources on Leitholm
Scottish Parliament Petition by Hunt girl grooms
Scottish Borders council: Leitholm Settlement Profile 2004
Scottish Borders Council: Eccles/Leitholm Primary School HM Inspection 2005
Borders Family History Society: Eccles and Leitholm
GEOGRAPH image: "Ford through Leet Water between Leitholm and Marfield"

Villages in the Scottish Borders